Brian Foster (born February 4, 1987) is an American professional ice hockey goaltender who is currently playing for the Wheeling Nailers in the ECHL on loan from Wilkes-Barre/Scranton Penguins of the American Hockey League (AHL). He was selected by the Florida Panthers of the National Hockey League in the 5th round (161st overall) of the 2005 NHL Entry Draft. Foster was born in Pembroke, New Hampshire.

Playing career
Prior to turning professional, Foster attended the University of New Hampshire where he played four seasons with the New Hampshire Wildcats men's ice hockey team which competes in NCAA's Division I in the Hockey East conference.

During the 2011–12 season, Foster was recalled from AHL affiliate, the San Antonio Rampage, by the Panthers on February 1, 2012, to serve as the back-up for Scott Clemmensen, while starter Jose Theodore was injured. He made his NHL debut on February 4, 2012, against the Tampa Bay Lightning, relieving Clemmensen during the second period of the game.  This would represent Foster's only NHL appearance to date, as he was reassigned to the Rampage four days later on February 8, 2012.

On February 15, 2013, while playing for the Cincinnati Cyclones, Foster became the 11th goaltender in ECHL history to be credited with a goal in the game between the Cyclones and the visiting Trenton Titans.

On August 20, 2013, Foster signed as free agent to a one-year ECHL contract with the Stockton Thunder.

After one season with Lillehammer IK in the Norwegian GET-ligaen, Foster transferred to the Danish League, signing a two-year deal with Esbjerg Energy on July 2, 2015. Foster was later released from his contract in Denmark a month later in order to sign an AHL contract with the Wilkes-Barre/Scranton Penguins on August 3, 2015. He was later assigned to ECHL affiliate, the Wheeling Nailers, to begin the 2015–16 season.

Career statistics

Awards and honors

References

External links 
 

1987 births
Living people
American men's ice hockey goaltenders
Bossier-Shreveport Mudbugs players
Cincinnati Cyclones (ECHL) players
Des Moines Buccaneers players
Florida Panthers draft picks
Florida Panthers players
Lillehammer IK players
New Hampshire Wildcats men's ice hockey players
People from Pembroke, New Hampshire
Ice hockey people from New Hampshire
San Antonio Rampage players
Stockton Thunder players
Wheeling Nailers players
American expatriate sportspeople in Norway
Wilkes-Barre/Scranton Penguins players
AHCA Division I men's ice hockey All-Americans